Casey at the Bat is a 1927 American silent film, directed by Monte Brice, written by Ernest Thayer and based on the 1888 baseball poem of the same name. The picture stars Wallace Beery, Ford Sterling, ZaSu Pitts and Sterling Holloway in his film debut. Surviving period advertisements indicate Eddie Sutherland may have been slated as director before Brice. A copy was preserved at the Library of Congress.

Cast 
 Wallace Beery as Casey
 Ford Sterling as O'Dowd
 ZaSu Pitts as Camille
 Sterling Holloway as Elmer Putnam
 Spec O'Donnell as Spec
 Iris Stuart as Trixie
 Sydney Jarvis as McGraw
 Lotus Thompson as Rosalind Byrne
 Sally Blane as Florodora Girl

See also 
 Breaking into the Big League (1913)
 Babe Comes Home (1927)

References

External links 
 
 
 Poster of Beery in the film

1927 films
1920s sports comedy films
American silent feature films
American black-and-white films
Films based on poems
Paramount Pictures films
American baseball films
American sports comedy films
1927 comedy films
Casey at the Bat
Films directed by Monte Brice
1920s American films
Silent American comedy films
1920s English-language films
Silent sports comedy films